Greg Brooks is an American comic book artist, best known for his work on the 1988 Crimson Avenger mini-series. He also did work on the Green Lantern, as well as two Marvel titles.

In 1988, he was convicted of murdering his wife.

References 

Year of birth missing (living people)
Living people
American comics artists